is a pro wrestling video game developed and published by Nintendo. It was released originally for the Famicom Disk System in Japan in 1986. It was later released in North America and Europe on the Nintendo Entertainment System. The game was the third wrestling game on the Nintendo Entertainment System (after M.U.S.C.L.E. and Tag Team Wrestling).

Gameplay
The player chooses a character from a roster of six wrestlers, each with a unique set of wrestling moves. In addition to punching, kicking, and running attacks, wrestlers may "lock up" with each other to execute body slams, piledrivers, and other professional wrestling moves. Wrestlers are also able to climb the top two turnbuckles for additional high-flying attacks. Matches are one-on-one, with no option for tag team bouts. Downed opponents may be hauled up from the mat, allowing the opponent a window to execute additional attacks, or may be pinned instead. As in professional wrestling, a wrestler who is pinned for a three count loses the match. One-player matches are timed, with the match being declared a draw if no pinfall occurs within the five-minute time limit.

It is possible to leave the ring; however, a player who does so must re-enter the ring before the referee's 20-count.  Failure to do so results in a loss (via count-out) or a draw (double count-out), if both wrestlers fail to re-enter in time.  (Note: The referee's count is broken only after both wrestlers have re-entered the ring.  That is, as long as at least one wrestler is outside the ring, the referee's count continues.  Moreover, it is possible for a wrestler to be counted out while executing a "plancha" if he has crossed the ring ropes by the count of 20.)

The game was one of the first wrestling games to feature an in-ring referee.  The referee in the game is fairly accurate. For example, whenever a pinfall is attempted, the referee must run to where the two wrestlers are, lie on his stomach, and begin the three count.  In effect, if the referee is on the other side of the ring when an opponent initiates a pin, the player will have additional time to try and escape. The game was also the first wrestling title to feature a cameraman at ringside (though he does not interact with the wrestlers).

Single player
Single player mode consists of two parts.  First, the player fights in matches against increasingly difficult CPU opponents. After winning five matches, the player fights King Slender, the Video Wrestling Association (VWA) Champion. If the player has selected King Slender for play, then he will face Giant Panther for the VWA Championship, though some versions of the game have a bug requiring King Slender to win more than the usual five matches before being granted the title shot.

After winning the VWA Title, the second stage of gameplay begins.  As the VWA Champion, the player has to defend the title.  Making ten successful title defenses (two against each of the five remaining characters) will result in a title match against the Great Puma, champion of the Video Wrestling Federation. Defeating Puma will make a player the interpromotional VWA/VWF Champion and end the game.  It is worth noting that some Nintendo aficionados consider the Great Puma to be one of the most difficult boss characters to ever appear on the NES.

Two players

The two player mode in Pro Wrestling features essentially the same gameplay as single player, though without the championship quest. Each player selects a wrestler and then proceed directly into the match. The game prevents the same character from being chosen for both players.  Unlike the single player mode, each match is a best-of-three-falls match. Two-player matches also lack the five-minute time limit of the single-player mode.

Roster
 Fighter Hayabusa (Japan)
 Giant Panther (U.S.A.)
 Kin Corn Karn (Korea)
 King Slender (U.S.A.)
 Starman (Mexico)
 The Amazon (Parts Unknown), which served as inspiration for Amazonian Blanka in 1991's Street Fighter 2.

Development
Masato Masuda thought up the game system and was the sole programmer while he was at TRY, which later merged with Sonata to become Human. Masuda later created Human's popular Fire Pro Wrestling series. US copyright records list "Try Company, Ltd." as the author.

Reception
Pro Wrestling was scored a total of 30 out of 40 by the staff of Famicom Tsūshin (Famitsu). Computer Gaming World named it as the Best Sports Game of 1988 for Nintendo, stating that it offered "realistic graphics, non-stop action and realistic wrestling moves. It concluded that Pro Wrestling was "the only wrestling game that really understands what it is simulating". Game Informer named it the 79th best game ever made in 2001. The staff considered it a trail blazer and praised its soundtrack.

Famitsu reported that Pro Wrestling was the #1 video game in the United States for about two months.

The game's Engrish victory message "A Winner Is You" has become an internet meme.

See also

List of licensed wrestling video games

References

External links
Laundrie, Evan: , Classicgaming.com Game of the Week, February 16, 2001.
Pro Wrestling at Hardcore Gaming 101
Pro Wrestling at NinDB

1986 video games
Nintendo Entertainment System games
Famicom Disk System games
Professional wrestling games
Nintendo games
PlayChoice-10 games
Internet memes
Video games developed in Japan
Nintendo arcade games
Nintendo Switch Online games